The Themis family (adj. Themistian) is a family of carbonaceous asteroids located in the outer portion of the asteroid belt, at a mean distance of 3.13 AU from the Sun. It is one of the largest families with over 4700 known members, and consists of a well-defined core of larger bodies surrounded by a region of smaller ones. The collisional Themis family is named after its parent body, the asteroid 24 Themis, discovered on 5 April 1853 by Italian astronomer Annibale de Gasparis.

Description 

The Themis family is one of the largest and longest-recognized dynamical families of asteroids, and is made up of C-type asteroids with a composition believed to be similar to that of carbonaceous chondrites. To date, the Themis family comprises approximately 535 known asteroids.

Asteroids in the Themis family share the following orbital elements:
 semimajor axes between 3.08 AU and 3.24 AU
 orbital eccentricities between 0.09 and 0.22
 orbital inclinations of less than 3°

List 

Some of the largest members of this family include:

 24 Themis
 62 Erato
 90 Antiope
 104 Klymene
 171 Ophelia 
 222 Lucia
 223 Rosa
 316 Goberta
 379 Huenna
 383 Janina
 468 Lina
 492 Gismonda
 515 Athalia
 526 Jena
 767 Bondia
 846 Lipperta

See also 
 Hirayama family

References

External links 
 Nesvorny HCM Asteroid Families V3.0, Small Bodies Data Ferret

Asteroid groups and families